Otto Lohse (21 September 1859 – 5 May 1925) was a German conductor and composer.

Born in Dresden, Lohse studied with Hans Richter and Felix Draeseke at the Dresden Conservatory.  In 1882 he became conductor of two music societies in Riga, the Wagner Society and the Imperial Russian Music Society; seven year's later he became the first kapellmeister of the city's Stadttheater.  In September 1893 he became 2nd Kapellmeister at the Hamburg Stadttheater (Director and 1st Kapellmeister was Gustav Mahler); while in Hamburg he married in March 1895 soprano Katharina Klafsky. During his two seasons (each 9 months) at the Hamburg Theater he conducted a total of 343 performances of 42 different operas . The couple traveled to the United States in the summer of 1896 (breaching their contract with the Hamburg Opera) to join the Damrosch Opera Company, returning to Germany a year later.  From then on, Lohse held important conductorial posts at Strasbourg (1897-1904), Riga Stadttheater (1899-1900), Cologne (1903–11), the Théâtre de la Monnaie (1911–12), and the Stadttheater in Leipzig (1912–23).  He also directed performances of Richard Wagner's music dramas at Covent Garden, London, from 1901 until 1904.  Lohse received the honorary title of Royal Professor in 1916.  His only opera, Der Prinz wider Willen, was performed in Riga in 1890.

Lohse died in Baden-Baden in 1925.

References
David Ewen, Encyclopedia of the Opera: New Enlarged Edition.  New York; Hill and Wang, 1963.

1859 births
1925 deaths
German conductors (music)
German male conductors (music)
German composers
19th-century German musicians
19th-century German male musicians